Netrocerocora is a monotypic moth genus of the family Noctuidae erected by Max Bartel in 1902. Its only species, Netrocerocora quadrangula, was first described by Eduard Friedrich Eversmann in 1844 as Noctua quadrangula.

References

Noctuinae
Monotypic moth genera